PacketFence is an open-source network access control (NAC) system which provides the following features: registration, detection of abnormal network activities, proactive vulnerability scans, isolation of problematic devices, remediation through a captive portal, 802.1X, wireless integration and User-Agent / DHCP fingerprinting.

The company that develops PacketFence, Inverse Inc. was acquired by Akamai Technologies on February 1, 2021.

PacketFence version 10 supports Red Hat Enterprise Linux 7 and its derivatives, notably CentOS, and Debian Stretch. Inverse Inc. has also been releasing a version of PacketFence dubbed the "Zero Effort NAC", which is a standalone Virtual Appliance that is preconfigured installation of PacketFence, making it easier than ever to deploy a NAC in your environment.

PacketFence version 11 added support for Red Hat Enterprise Linux 8 and it's derivatives, notably CentOS, and Debian Bullseye.
https://en.wikipedia.org/wiki/

Further reading

External links
PacketFence website
PacketFence on GitHub

References

 FLOSS Weekly 155: PacketFence, at the FLOSS Weekly podcast, March 2, 2011, retrieved March 3, 2011.

Internet Protocol based network software
Computer network security
Free network management software